This is a list of Croatian television related events from 1973.

Events

Debuts

Television shows

Ending this year

Births
29 December - Damir Markovina, actor

Deaths